Joseph W. Brooks (July 7, 1891 – November 27, 1953) was an American football player and coach.  He played for Williams College and Colgate University from 1909 to 1914.  He was the head football coach at Williams College in 1916, 1919 and 1920.

Athlete
Brooks played college football at the tackle position and place kicker for Williams College from 1909 to 1910 and for Colgate University from 1912 to 1914.  He kicked four placement goals in a 1913 game against Syracuse University and was selected as an All-Eastern player.  The New York Times called him "a great placement goal kicker" and "one of the greatest offensive tackles of the country."

Coach
After graduating from Colgate in 1915, he remained there as an assistant football coach in the 1915.  In 1916, he coached the Williams College football team.

In January 1917, Brooks was ruled ineligible to play amateur hockey for the Irish-American Athletic Club in the American Amateur Hockey League due to his having served as a coach at Williams College in 1916.

After the United States entered World War I in the spring of 1917, Brooks served in France with the United States Army as a captain with the 150th Machine Gun Battalion of the 42nd Division.

After being discharged from the military, Brooks returned to his position as the head football coach at Williams College.  He was the head coach at Williams for the 1916, 1919 and 1920 seasons.

In December 1920, Brooks announced that he would spend the 1921 football season as an assistant football coach for Columbia University.

On January 1, 1921, Brooks' brother, George Bruce Brooks (also a football player for Williams College), shot Julian Dick at a New Year's party in New York City.  Brooks donated blood for a transfusion, but the shooting victim died.

In October 1931, Brooks survived an airplane crash in South Bend, Indiana shortly after becoming engaged to Alicia Patterson.  The couple was married two months later and the couple, both of whom were licensed pilots, flew to Florida and later to Mexico, in their own plane.

Head coaching record

References

1891 births
1953 deaths
American football tackles
Colgate Raiders football coaches
Colgate Raiders football players
Columbia Lions football coaches
Williams Ephs football coaches
United States Army personnel of World War I